Jacob Breeland (born November 20, 1997) is an American football tight end who is a free agent. He played college football at the University of Oregon and signed with the Ravens as an undrafted free agent in 2020.

Early years
Breeland attended and played high school football at Trabuco Hills.

College career
Breeland enrolled at Oregon on August 21, 2015. Breeland first saw the field in 2016 as a  redshirt freshman, becoming Oregon's starting tight end for his remaining three years at the university. Breeland missed the last eight games of his senior season due to an ACL tear. Breeland declared for the 2020 NFL draft.

College career statistics

Professional career

Baltimore Ravens
Breeland signed with the Baltimore Ravens as an undrafted free agent in 2020. He was placed on the active/non-football injury list on July 27, 2020. He was waived with a non-football injury designation on August 5, 2020, and reverted to the team's reserve/non-football injury list the next day after clearing waivers. He was placed on the active/non-football injury list at the start of training camp again on July 21, 2021. He was waived with a non-football injury designation on August 9, 2021.

References

External links
Baltimore Ravens bio
Oregon Ducks bio

1996 births
Living people
American football tight ends
Oregon Ducks football players
Baltimore Ravens players
Sportspeople from Mission Viejo, California
Players of American football from California